Robert Christopher Nankeville, known professionally as Bobby Davro (born 13 September 1958), is an English actor and comedian.

He made his television debut in 1981 followed by breakthrough in Live from Her Majesty's (1983); this was followed by appearances on the television show Copy Cats.

Between 2007 and 2008, Davro played Vinnie Monks in the BBC One soap EastEnders. He participated in Dancing on Ice in 2010, and took part in Your Face Sounds Familiar in 2013. Over the years, he has appeared in pantomime many times.

Career
Davro appeared on a variety of television shows, mostly with ITV, throughout the 1980s and 1990s. His popularity was at its highest during the mid-1980s with his own Saturday night ITV shows, Bobby Davro on the Box, Bobby Davro's TV Annual and Bobby Davro's TV Weekly. He also made appearances on the popular comedy impressions sketch show Copy Cats. While he went on to make two more shows with Television South for ITV; Davro's Sketch Pad and Davro in 1990, by this time the comedian's brand of humour was proving to be less popular with audiences, and ratings for his shows declined.

The 1990s saw Davro switching channels to the BBC, appearing on television shows such as Public Enemy Number One. During the filming of Public Enemy Number One he suffered a broken nose when the pillory he was placed in, not being secured vertically, toppled over projecting him face-first onto the studio's concrete floor. This incident was not televised but was used in a BBC safety video, and Inside No.9's halloween special of 2018, "Dead Line".

On the short-lived show Rock with Laughter, Davro made another attempt at the comedy sketch-show format that had proved so successful for him in the 1980s. He replaced John Eccleston as co-presenter on the game show Run the Risk with Peter Simon: this featured on the BBC's Saturday morning children's show Live & Kicking. Davro returned to UK TV screens in May 1997, as host of Yorkshire Television's Winner Takes All for 65 episodes; this was produced for Challenge TV.

Between 10 June and 5 July 2015, Davro appeared at the King's Head Theatre, Islington as ping-pong-playing London cab driver Eric in a revival of Simon Block's comedy Not a Game for Boys. He was joined in the cast by Alan Drake and Oliver Joel and was directed by Jason Lawson. The production was well-received, with Danny Coleman-Cooke of the British Theatre website commenting: "Davro is brilliant as the sexist, bitter captain from hell Eric.  Davro really captures the tragedy of the character and his quest for escapism, especially in the scene where Eric admits that his 45 minutes a week at the table is the only time in life that he feels truly happy. The funnyman has clearly not lost his comic timing but the depth and emotion of his performance here may well surprise some of his fans and critics alike."

In December 2015, Davro announced a 20-date UK tour for the following year, starting at the Epsom Playhouse on 17 May 2016. On 6 February 2015, he was a guest of Graham Norton on his weekly BBC Radio 2 show.

Live performances
In 2005, he appeared in Birmingham as an act for Jasper Carrott's Rock With Laughter, alongside performers such as, Bill Bailey, Jasper Carrott, Lenny Henry, Bonnie Tyler, Tammy Palmer and the Lord of the Dance troupe.
In 2005 and 2006, he performed on stage in Aladdin with Melinda Messenger and John Rhys Davies in Woking, Surrey.
Davro performed in Jack and the Beanstalk at the Orchard Theatre in Dartford in 2010 and 2011.
In 2011, he performed at the Derngate Theatre, Northampton, in Aladdin.
In 2012, he returned to the Derngate Theatre in a production of Cinderella alongside Denise Welch.
In 2013, he co-starred in the pantomime of Robin Hood at the Theatre Royal Plymouth alongside Lee Mead and Nigel Havers.
In February 2016, Davro appeared in a free gig at The Railway Inn, Billingshurst, as headline on their monthly Joke Club night.
In March and April 2016 he appeared as Scarecrow in the pantomime The Wizard of Oz at Dorking Halls, Dorking.
 In 2017, he appeared at the Southend Cliffs Pavilion as Silly Billy in Jack and the Beanstalk
 Muddles in sleeping beauty at Lyceum Theatre, Crewe .

EastEnders
In August 2007, Davro joined the cast of the BBC One soap opera EastEnders, playing Vinnie Monks, a love interest for Shirley Carter. The character first appeared on screen in October. He left in autumn 2008, later claiming his character "wasn't very good and they didn't give me proper storylines".

Guest appearances
In 1987, Bobby Davro appeared in an episode of Rainbow titled Guess Who I Am where he did impressions of Bungle, Zippy, George and Geoffrey.

In 2006, Davro made a special guest appearance as a judge on Channel 5's All Star Talent Show.

On 20 September 2009, he appeared in a new series of the Channel 4 programme Come Dine with Me. This was a celebrity episode in which he appeared with EastEnders actress Laila Morse, DJ Dane Bowers and former The Word presenter Dani Behr. Davro attained second place.

Dancing on Ice

Davro took part in the ITV skating show Dancing on Ice in January 2010, and was paired with newcomer Molly Moenkhoff. He began the show as a 66/1 outsider to be the outright winner, and made his first and only competitive appearance along with the other male celebrities in week 2. Following a poor performance he was the first male celebrity to be eliminated, after a dance-off against actor Gary Lucy.

Your Face Sounds Familiar
In 2013, Davro along with other celebrities took part in the ITV entertainment series Your Face Sounds Familiar. He was eliminated in the fifth week. His chosen charity for the series was Kids 'n' Cancer.

Celebrity Big Brother

After dismissing reality shows including Big Brother, Britain's Got Talent and I'm a Celebrity and saying he would never appear on such series, in 2015 Davro entered the Celebrity Big Brother house to take part in the sixteenth series. On 24 September, he reached the final and was placed 4th.

Personal life
Trudi Jameson, the mother of Davro's three children, is from Sutton Coldfield. The couple parted in 2003.

Between 2007 and 2011 Davro dated Vicky Wright, daughter of Wolves and England footballer  Billy Wright.

Davro's father, Bill Nankeville, was a runner; a British national mile and 1500m champion, world-record holder, and represented Great Britain in two Olympic Games. In 2003 Davro was one of the contestants in the Channel 4 reality TV show The Games, in which 10 celebrities competed against each other in Olympic style events.

Charity
Davro is a supporter of the UK charity Kids 'n' Cancer.

References

External links

Richard Herring meets Bobby Davro

1958 births
English male comedians
English impressionists (entertainers)
English male soap opera actors
Living people
People from Ashford, Surrey
20th-century English comedians
21st-century English comedians